Joy Johnson may refer to:

 Joy Johnson (university administrator) (21st century), Canadian nurse and medical researcher
 Joy Johnson (runner) (1926–2013), American runner
 E. Joy Johnson (1876–1946), American novelist